The Cainian Chronicle is Ancient’s second full length release. On another note, the album’s length is 66 minutes and six seconds long.

The concept of the first part of the record (tracks 1-4) is a retelling of the story of Cain, based not on the traditional Biblical tale, rather on the supplement The Book of Nod of the Vampire: the Masquerade roleplaying game. the first son of Adam and Eve and the first murderer. It chronicles his casting out, his relations with Lilith (the first wife of Adam in this interpretation) and the leading to the procreation of their children, the Disciplines of Cain. The three part opus corresponds to three parts of The Book of Nod. "At the Infernal Portal" contains lines from Dante’s Divine Comedy, and the rest of the album is based on traditional Paganism.

Track listing 
All music by Aphazel except for 5 by Aphazel and Alex Kurtagić and 9 by Kaiaphas.
All lyrics by Kaiaphas except 5 taken from Dante’s Divine Comedy.

Credits 
 Aphazel - All guitars, bass and synth
 Kimberly Goss - Vocals
 Kjetil - Drums
 Lord Kaiaphas - Vocals, drums on tracks 5, 8, 9 and 11
 Produced by Dan Swanö and Ancient
 Engineered / Mixed by Dan Swanö

References 

1996 albums
Ancient (band) albums
Albums produced by Dan Swanö